One Piece is a Japanese manga series written and illustrated by Eiichiro Oda which has been translated into a number of languages and become a media franchise. It follows the adventures of seventeen-year-old Monkey D. Luffy, whose body developed the properties of rubber when he accidentally ate a supernatural fruit, as he travels the oceans in search of the series' titular treasure with the Straw Hats (a ragtag crew of pirates). In Japan, the series is published by Shueisha – in chapters in the shōnen manga anthology Weekly Shōnen Jump since July 22, 1997, and in tankōbon (collected volumes making up from about 10 to 12 chapters) format since December 24, 1997.

In North America, Viz Media is publishing an English-language adaptation of the series – in chapters in the manga anthology Shonen Jump since the magazine's November 2002 debut, and in tankōbon format since June 2003. In the United Kingdom the tankōbon were published by Gollancz Manga from March 2006 until Viz Media took over after the fourteenth volume. In Australia and New Zealand, the English volumes have been distributed by Madman Entertainment since November 10, 2008.


Volume list

Lists of main series chapters
 List of One Piece chapters 1 to 186
 List of One Piece chapters 187 to 388
 List of One Piece chapters 595 to 806
 List of One Piece chapters 807 to 1015
 List of One Piece chapters 1016 to now

See also
 List of One Piece media

References

Chapter 3

es:Anexo:Volúmenes de One Piece
fr:Liste des chapitres de One Piece
it:Capitoli di One Piece
fi:Luettelo One Piecen mangaluvuista
vi:Các chương trong One Piece